is a Japanese manga written and illustrated by Shinji Saijyo. The manga was licensed in English by ComicsOne before the license was transferred to DrMaster.

A sequel, Iron Wok Jan! R: The Summit Operations, was also released in Japan by Akita Shoten and in France by Soleil Manga. A spin-off, Tetsupai no Jan!, by Bingo Morihashi, started to be published by Takeshobo in 2015.

Characters

Akiyama family
 is a 16-year-old talented young chef and the male protagonist of the manga. His grandfather is Kaiichiro Akiyama, the “master of Chinese cuisine”.
 is known as the “master of Chinese cuisine”. Kaiichiro raised Jan until his tastebuds began to fail, at which point he sent Jan to Gobancho and committed suicide by self-immolation.
 is Jan's grandmother and Kaiichiro's wife.
 is Jan's father and Kaiichiro's son.

Gobanchou family
 is one of the best cooks in Gobanchou, her family's Chinese restaurant in Ginza, Tokyo. She is the same age as Jan.

Publication
Akita Shoten released the 27 tankōbon manga between June 1995 and March 2000. The manga was re-released into 16 kanzenban volumes between December 2004 and September 2007. ComicsOne published the manga's 27 tankōbon between December 15, 2002, and December 28, 2007.

Akita Shoten started releasing the sequel, on November 9, 2006, and concluded on December 9, 2010, in the Weekly Shōnen Champion magazine. From March 8, 2007, to January 8, 2009, the publisher released ten bound volumes.

A spin-off series, written and illustrated by Bingo Morihashi started its serialization on Takeshobo's Kindai Mahjong magazine on August 12, 2015. The successor of manga, titled Iron Work Jan 2nd, which was released in January 2017 in the February 2017 issue of Kadokawa's Monthly Dragon Age.

Reception
Comics Worth Reading's Johanna Draper Carlson comments on the illustrator's use of caricatures to dramatise the manga. Manga Life's Michael Aronson commends the manga for its art and its ability to appeal to audiences. Animefringe.com's Ridwan Khan comments on the "love-hate relationship" between Jan and Kiriko. IGN's A.E. Sparrow comments on the artist's ability to make a cooking competition as compelling to watch "as watching two feudal clans go to war".

References

Further reading

External links

Akita Shoten manga
ComicsOne titles
Cooking in anime and manga
Fictional chefs
Martial arts anime and manga
Shōnen manga
Takeshobo manga